Banawa is the capital city of Donggala Regency, Indonesia.

The Banawa district has the highest population density in Donggala Regency, with 330 people per km2 in 2012.

The capital of Donggala was moved in Banawa following a decision in the Donggala Parliament which resulted in memorandum No. 16 1995.

Climate
Banawa has a relatively dry tropical rainforest climate (Af) with moderate rainfall year-round.

References

Geography of Central Sulawesi